Horace Owen Eller (July 5, 1894 – July 18, 1961), better known as Hod Eller, was a pitcher in Major League Baseball.

Eller started his minor league career in 1913. In 1915, he won 19 games for the Moline Plowboys of the Illinois–Indiana–Iowa League. His performance gained the attention of the Cincinnati Reds, and he was drafted by the team after the 1916 season. He pitched five years for the Reds, going 60–40 with a 2.62 earned run average (108 Adjusted ERA+).

Eller peaked in the Reds' pennant-winning 1919 season. He led the team in innings, and went 19–9 with a 2.39 ERA. On May 11 of that season, Eller no-hit the St. Louis Cardinals 6–0 at Redland Field. He then pitched two complete game victories in the World Series, but it was later revealed that members of the Chicago White Sox had intentionally thrown the series for money. In Game Five of that Series, Eller shut out the White Sox 5–0 with nine strikeouts, including six consecutively—a record that would be tied by Moe Drabowsky in the 1966 World Series opener.

After his major league career ended, Eller played in the minors for a few years, last playing for the Indianapolis Indians in 1924.

The Baseball Record Book records that on August 21, 1917, Eller struck out three batters on nine pitches in the ninth inning of a 7–5 win over the New York Giants; however, the New York Times from the day after the game noted that Eller allowed a single to start that inning, and so did not officially achieve an immaculate inning.

See also
 List of Major League Baseball no-hitters

References

External links

 
 Obituary at The Deadball Era

1894 births
1961 deaths
Major League Baseball pitchers
Cincinnati Reds players
Champaign Velvets players
Danville Speakers players
Moline Plowboys players
Mount Sterling Essex players
Oakland Oaks (baseball) players
Indianapolis Indians players
Baseball players from Indiana
Sportspeople from Muncie, Indiana